Luiz Carlos Peixoto de Lima Ramos (born 24 December 1929) is a Brazilian former sailor who competed in the 1964 Summer Olympics.

References

1929 births
Living people
Brazilian male sailors (sport)
Olympic sailors of Brazil
Sailors at the 1964 Summer Olympics – Star
Place of birth missing (living people)